Joost Smiers (born 1943, Amsterdam) is a Dutch political scientist, best known as an opponent of copyright.

Smiers received his Ph.D.in Political Science in 1977 from the University of Amsterdam. He is currently Professor Emeritus of Political Science of the Arts and a Research Fellow in the Research Group Arts & Economics at the Utrecht School of the Arts, where he served as Professor from 1985 until his retirement in 2007.

Publications
1977. Cultuur in Nederland 1945-1955: Meningen en beleid. Amsterdam, PhD thesis, University of Amsterdam, Nijmegen.
1995. Artists and the infrastructure for their work, Council of Europe. Contribution to the World commission on Culture and Development. (with Suzanne Capiau).
1999. Kunst en kunstonderwijs in lokaal en mondiaal perspectief. Utrecht, Utrecht School of the Arts. (with Marieke van Schijndel).
2000. Tout ce qui est fragile exige une protection. Une collaboration entre les mouvements culturel et ecologiques. Paris, Institut Néerlandais.
2003. Arts under Pressure: Promoting Cultural Diversity in the Age of Globalisation. London: Zed Books. / 263 5.
2004. Artistic Expression in a Corporate World: Do We Need Monopolistic Control? Utrecht: Utrecht School of the Arts.
2006. Un mundo sin copyright: Artes y medios en la globalización. Barcelona, Gedisa, ISSN/
2006. (editor). UNESCO's Convention on the Protection and the Promotion of the Diversity of Cultural Expressions: Making it Work. Zagreb: CultureLink. (with Nina Obuljen)..
2009. Adieu auteursrecht, vaarwel culturele conglomeraten (en), Boom Uitgevers, The Hague,  (with Marieke van Schijndel).

1943 births
Living people
Intellectual property activism
Dutch political scientists
Academic staff of the Utrecht School of the Arts
University of Amsterdam alumni
Writers from Amsterdam